Philip Jackson (born 18 June 1948) is an English actor known for his many television and film roles, most notably as Chief Inspector Japp in both the television series Agatha Christie's Poirot and in BBC Radio dramatisations of Poirot stories; as Melvin "Dylan" Bottomley in Porridge; and as Abbot Hugo, one of the recurring adversaries in the cult 1980s series Robin of Sherwood.

Life and career
Jackson was born in Retford, Nottinghamshire. He started acting while studying Drama and German at the University of Bristol, and has worked in the theatre in Leeds, Liverpool and London. His stage work includes Pozzo in Samuel Beckett's Waiting for Godot at the Queen's Theatre in the West End in 1991 and Willy Loman in Arthur Miller's Death of a Salesman at the West Yorkshire Playhouse, Leeds in 2010. He was nominated for a Screen Actors Guild Award for his role in Little Voice (1998).

His many television appearances have included Coronation Street, Robin of Sherwood, A Touch of Frost, Foyle's War, Midsomer Murders, Heartbeat, Little Britain, Hamish Macbeth, Raised by Wolves and Last of the Summer Wine. He has also appeared in films, including the 1979 Scum and Paul McCartney's  Give My Regards to Broad Street, Brassed Off, Mike Bassett: England Manager, "Grow Your Own", and My Week with Marilyn. He also appeared in the music video of A-Ha's "Take On Me".

In 2000 he appeared as Dyer/Hawksmoor in Nick Fisher (broadcaster)'s adaptation for BBC Radio 4 of Peter Ackroyd's Hawksmoor (novel), and in 2001 he starred in the BBC Radio 4 adaptation of the Petrella mysteries by Michael Gilbert, and guest-starred in the Doctor Who audio play Valhalla. In 2009 he starred as Gaynor's father Roy in the BBC Two sitcom Home Time. In a BBC Radio 4 radio adaptation of Terry Pratchett's Night Watch, he played Commander Vimes and in Pratchett's Mort, he played Death's butler/cook, Albert who is eventually revealed to be Alberto Malich. He also voiced Risda Tarkaan on the BBC radio drama version of C. S. Lewis' The Last Battle. In 2011, he read Gulliver's Travels as an audiobook, as well as Martin Cruz Smith's Three Stations for BBC Radio 4’s Book at Bedtime.

In 2011, Jackson starred as Ron in the three-part BBC comedy drama series Sugartown alongside The Royle Family star Sue Johnston and actor Tom Ellis.

In 2012, he appeared in the twice Oscar nominated film My Week with Marilyn as Marilyn's security guard.

He plays Jaz Milvane in the long running Radio 4 series Ed Reardon's Week, written by Christopher Douglas and Andrew Nickolds.

Personal life
He is married to actress Sally Baxter, with whom he has two children, Amy and George Jackson (Conductor).

TV and filmography

 Porridge (1974, 1 episode) as Melvin "Dylan" Bottomley
 Last of the Summer Wine (1976, 3 episodes) as Gordon Simmonite 
 The Brothers (1976, 1 episode) as Garage Mechanic
 Pennies from Heaven (1978) as Dave
 Scum (1979) as Greaves
 Sounding Brass (1980) as  Arthur Mannion
 Coronation Street  (1982) as Smithy
 Give My Regards to Broad Street  (1984) as Alan
 Robin of Sherwood (1984–86) as Abbot Hugo de Rainault
 The Doctor and the Devils (1985) as Andrew Merry-Lees
 Slip-Up (1986, TV film) as Purgavie
 The Fourth Protocol (1987) as Burkinshaw
 The Play on One: The Dark Room (1988) as Greg
 High Hopes (1988) as Martin
 Hamish Macbeth (1996: "A Perfectly Simple Explanation") as Malachi McBean
 Brassed Off  (1996) as Jim
 The Opium War (1997) as Captain White
 Touching Evil (1997) as Jim Keller
 Bramwell (1 episode, 1997) as Ronald
 Little Voice (1998) as George
 Cousin Bette (1998) as De Wissembourg
 The Last Salute (12 episodes, 1998–1999) as Leonard Spanwick
 Murder Most Horrid (2 episodes, 1994–99)
 The Sins (2000), as Mickey
 Victoria Wood with All the Trimmings (2000) as Willis
 Mike Bassett: England Manager (2001) as Lonnie Urquart
 Silent Witness, (2001: "Faith") as Detective Inspector Mike Toner
 Crime and Punishment (2002) as Marmaladov
 Cruise of the Gods (2002) as Hugh Bispham
 Agatha Christie's Poirot (1989–2002, 2013) as Chief Inspector James Japp
 Little Britain (1 episode, 2003) as Breakfast Cereal Director
 Trust (2003 one episode only)
 Heartbeat (2 episodes, 1998–2004) as Brian Simpson
 Hustle (1 episode, 2004: "The Last Gamble") as Arthur Bond
 Murder in Suburbia (2004 one episode only) as Bill Jackson
 A Touch of Frost (2 episodes, 1999–2005) as Detective Sergeant Sharpe
 Funland (2005) as Leo Finch
 Foyle's War (2006: "Invasion") as Alan Carter
 New Tricks (2006) as suspect Andrew Bartlett
 The Chase (2007)
 Place of Execution (2008)
 The Long Walk to Finchley (2008) as Alderman Roberts
 Crooked House (2008)
 Midsomer Murders (1 episode, 2009: "The Glitch") as Daniel Snape
 Margaret (2009)
 Home Time (2009) as Roy Jacks
 Pete Versus Life (2010–2011) as Frank
 Sugartown (2011) as Ron
 My Week with Marilyn (2011) as Roger Smith
 Friend Request Pending (2011) as Trevor
 Stars in Shorts (2012) as Trevor
 Cuckoo (TV series) (2012) as Tony Edwards
 The Best Offer (2013) as Fred
 Believe (2013) as Bob
 Boomers (2014–2016) as Alan
 DCI Banks (2014: "Bad Boy") as Al Jenkins
 Death in Paradise (2014) as David Witton
 Raised by Wolves (2013–2016) as Grampy
 The Good Karma Hospital (2017) as Paul Smart
 Peterloo (2018)
 Shakespeare & Hathaway: Private Investigators (2020) as Chamberlin, episode 3.3 "The Sticking Place"
 Sherwood (2022) as  Mickey Sparrow

References

External links

1948 births
Alumni of the University of Bristol
English male film actors
English male television actors
Living people
People from Retford
20th-century English male actors
21st-century English male actors